Stabell is a surname. Notable people with the surname include:

Adolf Bredo Stabell (1807–1865), Norwegian newspaper editor, banker and politician
Adolf Bredo Stabell (diplomat) (1908–1996), Norwegian diplomat
Alfred Stabell (1862–1942), Norwegian sport shooter
Frederik Wilhelm Stabell (1763–1836), Norwegian military officer and politician
Graham Stabell, Australian cyclist
Harald Stabell (born 1947), Norwegian barrister
Joe Stabell (died 1923), American baseball player
Lars Bastian Ridder Stabell (1798–1860), Norwegian politician
Peter Platou Stabell (1908–1992), Norwegian barrister
Thea Stabell (born 1939), Norwegian actress